Sjef Janssen (born January 15, 1950) is the Dutch national Olympic team dressage coach and spouse of Anky van Grunsven. He won a bronze medal in team dressage at the 1991 European Dressage Championships in Donaueschingen, Germany.

References

Dressage trainers
Living people
1950 births
Dutch male equestrians
Place of birth missing (living people)